Strahinja Bošnjak (born 18 February 1999) is a Serbian professional footballer who plays as a defender for Borac Banja Luka in Bosnia and Herzegovina.

Club career
Born in Banja Luka, but spent his childhood in Kraljevo, he started out at local club Čibukovac. He also spent some time at OFK Beograd, before joining the youth system of Partizan. In the summer of 2015, Bošnjak was promoted to the first-team squad in preparations for the 2015–16 season. He was subsequently loaned to their affiliated side Teleoptik in early 2016.

In November 2016, Bošnjak signed his first professional contract with Partizan, on a three-year contract. He was again sent on loan to Teleoptik in the 2017 winter transfer window, helping them win the Serbian League Belgrade and promotion to the Serbian First League.

In July 2018, Bošnjak was loaned to Serbian SuperLiga club Zemun.

In the meantime, he played one season each in Voždovac and Kolubara before he returned to his hometown and signed for Borac Banja Luka in September 2021.

International career
Bošnjak represented Serbia at the 2016 UEFA European Under-17 Championship. He made his debut for the under-21 team in a friendly against Qatar U23 in December 2017.

Honours
Teleoptik
 Serbian League Belgrade: 2016–17
Partizan
 Serbian Cup: 2017–18

Notes

References

External links
 
 

1999 births
Living people
Serbian footballers
Serbia under-21 international footballers
Serbia youth international footballers
Sportspeople from Kraljevo
Association football defenders
FK Partizan players
FK Teleoptik players
FK Zemun players
FK Voždovac players
FK Kolubara players
FK Borac Banja Luka players
Serbian SuperLiga players
Serbian First League players
Serbian expatriate footballers
Expatriate footballers in Bosnia and Herzegovina
Serbian expatriate sportspeople in Bosnia and Herzegovina